Temryuksky District is an administrative district (raion), one of the thirty-eight in Krasnodar Krai, Russia. As a municipal division, it is incorporated as Temryuksky Municipal District. It is located in the west of the krai. Its administrative center is the town of Temryuk. Population:  The population of Temryuk accounts for 32.3% of the district's total population.

References

Notes

Sources

Districts of Krasnodar Krai